Hakim Mirza Muhammad Kamil Dehlavi (d. 1809/10), also known as Shahid Rabay (The Fourth Martyr) was an Indian Shia author and a practitioner of Unani medicine in Delhi.

Nuzhat-e-Isna Ashariya 
He authored Nuzhat-e-Isna Ashariya , a complete response to Shah Abdul Aziz Dehlavi's Tauhfa Ithna Ashari. It was due to this book that he was poisoned by the Sunni ruler Nawab of Jhajjhar of Indian state of Jhajhar. He also wrote more than 60 books besides Nuzhat–e-Isna Ashariya.

He is buried at dargah Panja Sharif at Kashmiri Gate, Delhi; alongside him Mufassir-e-Quran Maulana Syed Maqbool Ahmad Dehlavi too is buried. Every year Delhi Shia Waqf Board arranges a five majalis session in the memory of Mirza Muhammad Kamil Dehlavi.

See also 
The Five Martyrs
Shahid Awwal
Shahid Thani
Shahid Salis
Shahid Rabay
Shahid Khamis
Shah Abdul Aziz Dehlavi
Tauhfa Ithna Ashari

References

External links

Religious buildings and structures in Delhi
Indian Shia clerics
Shia scholars of Islam
Indian Muslims